Robert Michael Doornbos (born 23 September 1981) is a Dutch former racing driver who also competed with a Monégasque licence. He has been test and third driver for the Jordan and Red Bull Racing Formula One teams, as well as driving for Minardi and Red Bull Racing in 2005 and 2006. Doornbos then drove for Minardi Team USA in the 2007 and final season of the Champ Car World Series. He competed in the Superleague Formula racing series in 2008, and drove for the Netherlands team in A1 Grand Prix's 2008–2009 season. In 2009, Doornbos competed in the IndyCar Series. He began the season with Newman/Haas/Lanigan Racing, but switched to HVM Racing after the race in Kentucky Speedway.

Tennis player to racing driver
Doornbos's first sport was tennis. His interest in motorsport grew after he was invited to the 1998 Belgian Grand Prix as a guest of WilliamsF1. It was 1997 Formula One Champion Jacques Villeneuve who suggested that he should go for a series such as Formula Ford, as he was too big and too old to race karts. He gave up tennis and focused on racing, joining the JR racing team for the 1999 Opel Lotus UK Winter series. He had a successful season, finishing second in the championship after taking four pole positions, four fastest laps and four wins. In 2000, he competed in the Formula Ford Zetec Benelux series, finishing second in the Belgian championship and fifth overall with one pole, three fastest laps and six podiums.

Formula 3 career
Returning to the UK in 2001, Doornbos contested the Scholarship class of the British Formula Three championship with FGR Racing. He finished the year fifth in the championship, taking two poles, two wins and nine podiums. He drew attention to himself with a second-place finish in the Formula Three support race to the British Grand Prix. He then moved to the German Formula Three championship with Team Ghinzani. He picked up four podiums, but no win. The year also featured a sixth-place finish in the prestigious Macau Grand Prix. Continuing with the team in 2003, Doornbos competed in the European Formula Three Championship, visiting the podium seven times. He took pole position at Spa-Francorchamps for the Formula Three Masters event, and finished second in Korea.

Formula 3000
With support from Red Bull, Doornbos joined reigning International Formula 3000 champions Arden International for the 2004 FIA International Formula 3000 Championship. Partnered with Vitantonio Liuzzi, Doornbos claimed Rookie of the Year after finishing third in the championship. During the year, he took a fastest lap and four podium finishes, including a race win at Spa-Francorchamps.

Formula One

Jordan (2004)
Prior to the 2004 Chinese Grand Prix, it was announced that Doornbos would be the official Friday test driver for the Jordan Formula One team, replacing Timo Glock, who had been promoted to race duties in place of Giorgio Pantano, whose sponsorship money had "dried up". Doornbos impressed as test driver for the final few races of the season, and was reappointed with the newly-sold Jordan team for the 2005 season.

Doornbos completed Friday testing duties for Jordan in all but two of the first 11 events of the year, with French Renault F1 test driver Franck Montagny testing at the European Grand Prix, and Jordan being banned from using a third car at the Canadian Grand Prix after using too many tyres at the previous race.

Minardi (2005)
On 19 July Doornbos was appointed as a Minardi race driver for the 2005 German Grand Prix onwards, replacing Austrian Patrick Friesacher, who had encountered sponsorship issues. In his first Formula One race, he collided with Jacques Villeneuve, the man who gave advice to Doornbos to start his career as a race driver. Doornbos raced a total of eight Grand Prix for the team, his best result being a 13th position in the Turkish and Belgian Grands Prix.

Doornbos and teammate Christijan Albers would have become the first all-Dutch team line-up since Carel Godin de Beaufort and Ben Pon drove together for the Ecurie Maarsbergen team at the 1962 Dutch Grand Prix at Zandvoort were it not for the fact that Doornbos raced with a Monegasque licence.

Effectively, he became Minardi's last Formula One driver, since the team was bought by Red Bull just before the Belgian Grand Prix. In the final race of the season, Doornbos retired on the final lap while Albers had retired a few laps earlier.

Red Bull (2006)

The Minardi team ceased to exist in its previous form at the end of 2005, being bought out by Red Bull and becoming their Scuderia Toro Rosso team. Doornbos was unable to find a race drive for 2006, but Christian Horner, his former F3000 boss, had since been appointed as Sporting Director of Red Bull Racing, where he was appointed the team's test and reserve driver.

He thus spent most of 2006 testing at the racetracks on Fridays, ready to step into a race drive if either David Coulthard or Christian Klien were unable to race. In his role as the Red Bull test driver, he once more showed his talents as a racing driver. In the majority of the Grand Prix tests on Fridays, he was to be found in the top 10, and a number of times he achieved a top three time.

At the 2006 Hungarian Grand Prix, he was involved in a controversial incident with Fernando Alonso, which resulted in the Spaniard incurring a two-second qualifying penalty.

After the Italian Grand Prix, when Red Bull Racing announced that Klien had been dropped from the team, Doornbos was promoted to the second race driver role alongside Coulthard for the remaining three races. He entered with a bang by qualifying in the top 10 for his first race, in China. However, he touched Robert Kubica at the first corner during the race and the delay restricted him to 12th place at the finish.

Formula One demonstrations
In his role as Formula One test and racing driver, Robert Doornbos has given several demonstrations, both on tracks during other race events, as well as on public road. In the Netherlands, he has driven a Formula One car on public roads twice. In 2005, he was one of the drivers of the Monaco aan de Maas event in his hometown of Rotterdam. On 15 August 2006, he made the news with a fundraiser for the children of the 'Stichting Geluk en Vrijheid' (Foundation Happiness and Freedom). At a speed of 326 km/h (204 mph), he drove his Red Bull Formula One Car over the highway A7 on the Afsluitdijk in the Netherlands.

Champ Car World Series
After missing a racing seat for the 2007 Formula One season, Robert Doornbos signed a contract with Minardi Team USA for the 2007 Champ Car World Series season. He made a successful debut in the series in the first race of the season, the Vegas Grand Prix. After qualifying third, Doornbos finished on the podium, taking second place in the race. This made him the first rookie since Nigel Mansell in 1993 to make it to the podium in his first Champ Car race. A drive through penalty in 2007 Grand Prix of Cleveland quite possibly cost Robert a chance at his first Champ Car victory, but he still managed a fine second place behind Paul Tracy. One week later, however, Robert won the 2007 Mont-Tremblant Grand Prix in Canada and as a result took the joint lead of the championship with Sébastien Bourdais. After scoring this victory, the ESPN broadcast team dubbed him "Bobby D" – a nickname he reportedly enjoys. He later went on to win the 2007 San Jose Grand Prix after an accident during the first lap on turn one left him without his front wing. The accident inadvertently put him on an alternate pit strategy that he used to his advantage and secured the win. Although he impressed many fans and drivers alike with his personality and driving style, Doornbos would end up third in points at season's end, although he did win Roshfrans Rookie of the Year. After the merger of the CCWS and the Indy Car Series was announced for 2008, the Minardi half of the team elected not to take part, reducing HVM Racing to a one-car team. This left Doornbos without a drive for 2008.

Superleague Formula
After failing to secure a seat with competitive teams in the unified IndyCar Series, and refusing to drive for uncompetitive teams, Doornbos opted to sit out the 2008 season in search for a competitive seat in 2009. It was announced on 21 May 2008 that Doornbos would drive for A.C. Milan in the Superleague Formula, a newly created racing series where the cars are sponsored by football clubs. The club's technical director is the son of Giancarlo Minardi, former owner of the Minardi Formula One team under its take over by Paul Stoddart. Doornbos finished third in the inaugural 2008 season.

A1 Grand Prix
Doornbos and Jeroen Bleekemolen drove together in A1 GP for Team Netherlands in the 2008–09 season. The drivers alternated races. Team Netherlands finished 4th in the championship, with both drivers having scored one victory, both in sprint races.

IndyCar Series
Doornbos contested the 2009 IndyCar Series season with Newman/Haas/Lanigan Racing. Since he had no previous oval track racing experience, he has received coaching from fellow Dutchman Arie Luyendyk. Doornbos has finished no worse than 12th in his first three races but the highlight has been a second place start in his first oval track race at Kansas (helped by disqualifications of Dario Franchitti and Hélio Castroneves for dipping below the white line during qualifying). Lining up beside his teammate Graham Rahal, Newman/Haas/Lanigan cars formed the front row for the first time since Milwaukee in 2006. He took the lead after the first round of pit stops, but on that first stop under yellow he bumped a stationary tyre in the pit stall ahead of him. He was penalised to the rear of the field and was no longer a factor.

On 4 August 2009 Doornbos posted on his official website that he was leaving Newman/Haas/Lanigan Racing effective immediately. He stated that there was the option for him to leave the team after 12 races and he decided to take it. He also said that he would like to stay in IndyCar and would announce his future plans shortly.

On 5 August 2009 Doornbos signed with HVM Racing in the IndyCar Series for the remainder of the 2009 and to drive for the team through 2010, however this did not happen.

After racing
Doornbos co-founded Kiiroo, a Dutch company involved in the production of sex toys.

He is currently active as a Formula 1 analyst for Ziggo Sport.

Motorsports career results

Career summary

Complete Formula Three Euro Series results
(key) (Races in bold indicate pole position) (Races in italics indicate fastest lap)

Complete International Formula 3000 results
(key) (Races in bold indicate pole position) (Races in italics indicate fastest lap)

Complete Formula One results
(key) (Races in bold indicate pole position; races in italics indicate fastest lap)

† Did not finish the race, but was classified as he had completed more than 90% of the race distance.

American open-wheel racing results
(key) (Races in bold indicate pole position, races in italics indicate fastest race lap)

ChampCar

IndyCar Series

Indianapolis 500

Complete Superleague Formula results
(key) (Races in bold indicate pole position) (Races in italics indicate fastest lap)

2008

2010–2011

† Non Championship round

Complete A1 Grand Prix results
(key) (Races in bold indicate pole position) (Races in italics indicate fastest lap)

References

External links

 
 
 Robert Doornbos at Driver Database
 Robert Doornbos at F1 Database

Living people
1981 births
Sportspeople from Rotterdam
Dutch racing drivers
Dutch Formula One drivers
Indianapolis 500 drivers
IndyCar Series drivers
Champ Car drivers
Superleague Formula drivers
A1 Team Netherlands drivers
International Formula 3000 drivers
Minardi Formula One drivers
British Formula Three Championship drivers
Red Bull Formula One drivers
Monegasque Formula One drivers
Arden International drivers
HVM Racing drivers
Newman/Haas Racing drivers